, also called Azuma House (Japanese 東邸), is a personal residence in Sumiyoshi-ku, Osaka, Japan. It was designed by Japanese architect Tadao Ando in his early career. It was designed without exterior windows reflecting the desire of the owner to feel that he was not "in Japan", but to compensate for lost light, an interior courtyard with cross walkway was created. 

Ando's concrete architectural style, reflected in the design of the Azuma House, inspired the set design for the music video of Jamiroquai's "Virtual Insanity".

Further reading
Francesco Dal Co. Tadao Ando: Complete Works. Phaidon Press, 1997.

External links
 Photo gallery Archived

Tadao Ando buildings
Modernist architecture in Japan
Houses in Japan
Houses completed in 1976